The 2013–14 Texas Southern Tigers basketball team represented Texas Southern University during the 2013–14 NCAA Division I men's basketball season. The Tigers, led by second year head coach Mike Davis, played their home games at the Health and Physical Education Arena and were members of the Southwestern Athletic Conference. They finished the season 19–5, 12–6 in SWAC play to finish in second place. They were champions of the SWAC tournament to earn an automatic bid to the NCAA tournament where they lost in the First Four to Cal Poly.

Roster

Schedule

|-
!colspan=9 style="background:#800000; color:white;"| Regular season

|-
!colspan=9 style="background:#800000; color:white;"| SWAC tournament

|-
!colspan=9 style="background:#800000; color:white;"| NCAA tournament

References

Texas Southern Tigers basketball seasons
Texas Southern
Texas Southern
Texas Southern Tigers basketball
Texas Southern Tigers basketball